The 1925 Franklin & Marshall football team was an American football team that represented Franklin & Marshall College during the 1925 college football season. In its second season under head coach Charles Mayser, the team compiled a 5–4 record. The team played its home games at Williamson Field in Lancaster, Pennsylvania.

Schedule

References

Franklin and Marshall
Franklin & Marshall Diplomats football seasons
Franklin and Marshall football